2016 United States Olympic basketball team may refer to:

2016 United States men's Olympic basketball team
The United States women's team competing in basketball at the 2016 Summer Olympics